Mababe is a village in North-West District of Botswana. It is located in the eastern part of the district, and has a primary school. The population was 157 in 2001 census.

References

North-West District (Botswana)
Villages in Botswana